Orville B. "Bud" Fitch II is an American lawyer who served as Deputy Attorney General for the U.S. State of New Hampshire, and became the Acting Attorney General for New Hampshire, when Kelly Ayotte resigned on July 16, 2009. He left the Deputy Attorney General position in December 2010 to join Ayotte's staff. Previously he served as a Senior Assistant Attorney General heading the Civil Bureau of the New Hampshire Department of Justice.

In 2017, Fitch was hired by the office of the New Hampshire Secretary of State to investigate claims of voter fraud in New Hampshire.

References

Year of birth missing (living people)
Living people
New Hampshire lawyers
New Hampshire Republicans
People from Cornish, New Hampshire